Garn Boduan is an Iron Age hillfort and hill near Nefyn, on the Llŷn Peninsula in Wales.

In a survey in the 1950s the traces of over 170 round houses were identified on this site, and around 100 round houses are still visible on the ground. Between 100 and 400 people may have lived in this fort. The lower stone rampart is the original defence built in the Iron Age. At a later date, perhaps in the 6th/7th century AD, a smaller rampart was built on the eastern side.

See also
List of hillforts in Wales
List of Scheduled prehistoric Monuments in Gwynedd

References

External links

Coflein site record
Garn Boduan, BBC Wales
Garn Boduan, Rhiw.com

Buan, Gwynedd
Hillforts in Gwynedd
Iron Age Britain